Video of the Year may refer to:

BET Award for Video of the Year
Country Music Association Award for Video of the Year
Grammy Award for Video of the Year
Juno Award for Video of the Year
MTV Video Music Award for Video of the Year
Los Premios MTV Latinoamérica for Video of the Year
MTV Pilipinas for Video of the Year
MTV Video Music Award Japan for Video of the Year